The Motor Trend Car of the Year (COTY''') is an annual Car of the Year award given by Motor Trend magazine to recognize the best new or significantly refreshed car in a given model year.

 Background Motor Trend, which debuted in 1949, was the first publication to name a Car of the Year.

The earliest awards were given to the manufacturer or division, not for a specific vehicle. The 1958 Ford Thunderbird became the first single model to be selected. In 1970, the Ford Torino won the COTY while Motor Trend selected the Porsche 914 for its first Import COTY award.

In 1972, the low-volume imported Citroën SM won the overall COTY award. Between 1976 and 1999, the COTY award was split in two: Domestic COTY and Import COTY.The trophy was recombined in 2000 because the distinctions between domestic and import cars became increasingly difficult. The award has expanded to include a pickup truck (starting in 1979) and a separate sport utility vehicle (starting in 1999), which are recognized separately from the Car of the Year.

Over time, other publications and organizations have copied Motor Trend's Car of the Year award and created their own. These COTY designations may focus on regional markets, vehicle types, specific market segments, or other criteria. Some examples include the European Car of the Year that began in 1964 by a collective of automobile magazines, the Green Car of the Year selected by a panel of automotive and environmental experts, the Tow Car of the Year chosen by selected sponsors in the industry, and the Fleet Car of the Year that is voted by professional fleet managers.

ImpactMotor Trends Car of the Year is "one of the most prestigious honors bestowed in the auto industry."

The trophy for the winner, a depiction of calipers, is often used in the winning automaker's marketing and advertising. Most cars that win the award report a spike in sales.

Criteria
To be eligible for the award, a car must be an "all-new" or "substantially upgraded" vehicle that has been on sale within twelve months from the previous November, vehicles that have been on sale for over five years are ineligible for the award.

Between the contenders, it is not a comparison test. In 2014 as an example, the Motor Trend judges debated and evaluate each vehicle against six key criteria:

Motor Trend also only considers cars with base MSRPs less than $100,000 in order to avoid expensive luxury and super cars dominating the competition.

Vehicles are subjected a battery of tests: standard car tests such as skid-pad ratings, acceleration and quarter-mile times, and evaluations of the interiors are combined with a track run conducted by Sports Car Club of America-licensed testers and taking the cars out on normal roads to test their drivability under normal conditions, and fuel economy. Trucks and SUVs add towing capacity and speed, plus an off-road course, to the normal regimen.

Car of the Year Winners
Note that in 1970 and between 1976-2000, the Car of the Year award was split into two categories, domestic and import.

Import Car of the Year Winners
Introduced in 1970 for one year and then brought back in 1976 due to differences between imports and American cars. The award was discontinued after the 1999 model year when the difference between what was a domestic and an import had started to become problematic.

Truck of the Year Winners

SUV of the Year Winners
"SUV of the Year" was split from "Truck of the Year" in 1999.

Car of the Year (China)Motor Trend magazine's China-market cousin, Auto Club-Motor Trend'', also issues a "Car of the Year" award for that market.

Car of the Year
2011: BMW Brilliance 5 Series (long wheelbase)
2010: Shanghai-GM Buick Regal
2009: GAC-Honda Accord
2008: FAW-Volkswagen Magotan(Passat B6)
2007: GAC-Toyota Camry
2006: FAW-Toyota Crown
2005: Changan-Ford Mondeo
2004: FAW-Mazda 6
2003: Shanghai Volkswagen Polo

SUV of the Year Winners
2011: FAW-Volkswagen Audi Q5
2010: GAC Toyota Highlander
2009: Dongfeng Nissan X-Trail
2008: Guangqi Honda CRV
2007: Countermanded
2006: Shanghai GM SRX
2005: Guangqi Honda CRV
2004: Changfeng Automobile Liebao Feiteng

See also

 List of motor vehicle awards

References

Motor vehicle awards